Charalambis "Charis" Markopoulos (alternate spellings: Charalambos, Haris) (born January 20, 1982) is a former Greek professional basketball player and current professional assistant coach for Promitheas Patras of the Greek Basket League and the EuroCup.

Playing career

Pro clubs
Markopoulos played professional basketball with the Greek top-tier level Greek Basket League clubs Iraklis, Makedonikos, and PAOK. He also played in the European 2nd-tier level, FIBA Saporta Cup competition, and in the European top-tier level, FIBA SuproLeague competition, as a member of Iraklis. He also won the Greek Championship U-18 during 1997–98 season, along with Lazaros Papadopoulos.

His basketball playing career ended prematurely, due to complications from Guillain–Barré syndrome , that he suffered while played with Iraklis. Markopoulos paralysed during a flight from Thessaloniki to Luleå in 2001.

Greek national team
Markopoulos was a member of the junior national teams of Greece. With Greece's junior national team, he won the bronze medal at the 2000 FIBA Europe Under-18 Championship. He averaged 13.6 points, 5.1 rebounds, and 4.5 assists per game at the tournament.

He also won the silver medal at the 2000 Albert Schweitzer Tournament, where he was named to the All-Tournament Team, and was also named the MVP of the tournament.

Coaching career
Markopoulos became the head coach of the Greek Basket League club Koroivos in 2014. In 2016, he became the head coach of the Greek club Doxa Lefkadas.

Personal
Markopoulos' father, Soulis, is also a professional basketball coach, and former professional basketball player.

References

External links
Twitter
FIBA Player Profile
FIBA Europe Player Profile
Eurobasket.com Player Profile
BCPienozvaigzdes.lt Player Profile 
Aboveaverage.gr Player Profile
Draftexpress.com Player Profile
Interbasket.net Hellenic Hoops Prospects
Hellenic Federation Player Profile 

1982 births
Living people
Doxa Lefkadas B.C. coaches
Greek basketball coaches
Greek men's basketball players
Iraklis Thessaloniki B.C. coaches
Iraklis Thessaloniki B.C. players
Koroivos B.C. coaches
Makedonikos B.C. players
P.A.O.K. BC players
Point guards
Promitheas Patras B.C. coaches
Shooting guards
Basketball players from Thessaloniki
Xanthi B.C. players